†Cyclophorus horridulum was a species of small, air-breathing, land snails with an operculum, terrestrial pulmonate gastropod molluscs in the family Cyclophoridae.

This species was endemic to Mayotte. It is now extinct.

References 

Cyclophorus (gastropod)
Extinct gastropods
Taxonomy articles created by Polbot
Endemic fauna of Mayotte